Bloomsbury Social Centre was the name given to a building in Bloomsbury, London, which was squatted as a self-managed social centre by students in affiliation with Occupy London, and the global Occupy movement. It was occupied on Wednesday, 23 November 2011, and evicted on Thursday, 22 December, lasting a total of 30 days. It was situated at 53 Gordon Square, in an historic six-storey Georgian Grade II-listed building, renovated by famous British architect, Charles Holden, the principal architect of nearby Senate House.

Occupation
The self-managed social centre was squatted by University of London students as an act of protest against a number of political issues of the day, including cuts to the national budget by the incumbent Conservative-Liberal Democrat Coalition government, the tripling of university tuition fees in England and Wales, the wars in the Middle East, and, more generally, Free Market Capitalism, the political Right-wing, and neo-liberalism.

Activities
The occupiers aimed to make the Bloomsbury Social Centre into an open-access public space for the local community. For the duration of its existence, it was possible to book online one of the many spare rooms inside the building for unspecified use. The space was used for open and closed events by book clubs, university societies, artists, musicians, actors, and students. It served as a space for meetings, discussions, drama and music rehearsals, art projects, and group work sessions. The centre also routinely organized film nights, open forum discussions, English and foreign language classes, international cuisine cooking classes, bicycle workshops and other less-frequent events, all of which were free-of-charge. They set up a small museum on the first floor of the building, called the Museum of Neo-Liberalism, chronologizing its rise and fall. There was also a library set up on the fourth floor, with a focus on radical left-wing literature. The library, like the rest of the building, was open-access, and the public were actively encouraged to take advantage of this new large public space, for reading and working in. It provided desks, chairs and seating areas for this purpose.

Eviction
The building was under lease to the School of Oriental and African Studies, who responded to the occupation of the building by acquiring a Notice of Eviction. The occupiers were evicted by bailiffs at 7 A.M. on Thursday, 22 December 2011. At this point, the Bloomsbury Social Centre ceased to exist.

See also
Bank of Ideas
RampART
Really Free School
St Agnes Place

References

Buildings and structures in Bloomsbury
Evicted squats
Occupy movement in the United Kingdom
Social centres in the United Kingdom
Squats in the United Kingdom
Infoshops